The ESS 3200 was a class of electric locomotive that ran in Indonesia.

This type of electric locomotive was first used on April 6, 1925, which also was the inauguration of the first electrified rail line from Tanjung Priok to Meester Cornelis (Jatinegara).

The locos in this series were in use until 1976. They were of the 1-Bo+Bo-1 wheel-type, used a 1,500 V DC overhead catenary, producing . They were built by the Werkspoor using Baldwin equipment, and had  / Westinghouse electric motors. Six locomotives were built for the line. Although the 1,500 V DC system was the most popular of the 1920s, Baldwin-Westinghouse were better known for their AC electric locomotives.

Preservation 
After sitting idle for many years, one example (Number 3202) was restored to operational order and returned to the line where it ran for 50 years. It was returned to service and as of 2013, was hauling tourist trains near Jakarta. Although widely known as 3201, the original 3201 locomotive was destroyed as result of 1968 Ratujaya train collision.

The ESS 3202 electric locomotive is currently stored in Manggarai train workshop

See also 
 Baldwin-Westinghouse electric locomotives

References

Electric locomotives of Indonesia
3 ft 6 in gauge locomotives of Indonesia
Articles containing video clips
Railway locomotives introduced in 1925
1500 V DC locomotives
(1Bo)+(Bo1) locomotives